Joseph George Vetrano (October 15, 1918 – May 10, 1995) was an American football placekicker who played four seasons with the San Francisco 49ers of the All-America Football Conference (AAFC). He played college football at the University of Southern Mississippi and attended Neptune High School in Neptune Township, New Jersey.

College career
Vetrano played for the Southern Miss Golden Eagles from 1940 to 1942. He was inducted into the Southern Miss Golden Eagles M–Club Alumni Association Sports Hall of Fame on February 20, 1965.

Professional career
Vetrano signed with the AAFC's San Francisco 49ers after serving in the United States Army Air Forces during World War II and played for the 49ers from 1946 to 1949. He was nicknamed "The Little Toe", which was later shortened to "The Toe", during his pro career and recorded an AAFC record 108 extra points. On one extra point attempt, holder Frankie Albert fumbled the snap and Vetrano scored the point on a drop kick.  He told a story of mistakenly being sent in to kick on third down and ending up scoring a touchdown.

Coaching career
Vetrano was an assistant coach for the San Francisco 49ers from 1953 to 1956. He also served as a chief scout for the 49ers. He helped the backfield as an assistant coach for the Southern Miss Golden Eagles in 1967. Vetrano later coached high school football in New Jersey.

Death
Vetrano died of heart failure in Berkeley, California on May 10, 1995.

References

External links
 Just Sports Stats

1918 births
1995 deaths
American football defensive backs
American football halfbacks
American football placekickers
Southern Miss Golden Eagles football coaches
Southern Miss Golden Eagles football players
San Francisco 49ers (AAFC) players
San Francisco 49ers coaches
San Francisco 49ers scouts
High school football coaches in New Jersey
United States Army Air Forces personnel of World War II
Neptune High School alumni
People from Neptune Township, New Jersey
Sportspeople from Monmouth County, New Jersey
Players of American football from New Jersey
San Francisco 49ers players